Chirula is a village situated in Datia District of Indian state of Madhya Pradesh. The population according to the latest census is 2,412.

Demographics

According to the latest 2011 census, Chirula has a population of 2,412 divided into 604 families. The male population is 1,299 and that of females is 1,113. Chirula has an average literacy rate of 71.96 percent, higher than the state average of 69.32 percent. The male literacy rate is 83.74 percent, and the female literacy is 58.28 percent. In Chirula, 14.55 percent of the population is under 6 years of age. Out of the total population, 1,027 are engaged in work or business activity.

Scheduled Castes and Scheduled Tribes constitute 33.29 percent and 0.12 percent of the total population in Chirula.

Administration
Chirula village comes under the administration of Datia Tehsil. The village code is 454765 and it is administered by a sarpanch. Chirula has one primary school, one secondary school, one primary health sub-center, and a post office. There are a total of 277 boys and 267 girls enrolled in schools between the age of 5-14.

References

External links
Zila Panchayat, Datia
 OVERVIEW OF CENSUS 2011, Madhya Pradesh
 Village Directory of States of India

Villages in Datia district